The Social Action Party (Partido de Acción Social) is a political party in Colombia. At the last legislative elections, 12 March 2006, the party won 1 seat in the Chamber of Representatives. 

Political parties in Colombia